Brenda Spaziani (born 2 January 1984) is an Italian diver. She competed in the 10 metre platform event at the 2012 Summer Olympics.

References 

Divers at the 2012 Summer Olympics
Olympic divers of Italy
1984 births
Living people
Italian female divers